Preone is a comune (municipality) in the Province of Udine in the Italian region Friuli-Venezia Giulia, located about  northwest of Trieste and about  northwest of Udine.

Preone borders the following municipalities: Enemonzo, Socchieve, Tramonti di Sotto, Verzegnis, Vito d'Asio.

References

External links
 Paleontological Museum

Cities and towns in Friuli-Venezia Giulia